Senior Member may refer to:

Senior Member of the Executive Council of Hong Kong
Senior Member of the Legislative Council of Hong Kong
Senior Member, a rank in the United States' Civil Air Patrol
Senior Member of the Association for Computing Machinery (ACM)
Senior Member of the IEEE